Beautiful Chaos is a BBC Books original novel written by Gary Russell and based on the long running science fiction television series Doctor Who. It features the Tenth Doctor and Donna Noble. It was published on 26 December 2008, alongside The Eyeless and The Story of Martha.

Summary
Donna Noble is back home in London, catching up with her family and generally giving them all the gossip about her journeys. Her grandfather is especially overjoyed — he's discovered a new star and had it named after him. He takes the Tenth Doctor, as his special guest, to the naming ceremony.

But the Doctor is suspicious about some of the other changes he can see in Earth's heavens. Particularly that bright star, right there. No, not that one, that one, there, on the left...

The world's population is slowly being converted to a new path, a new way of thinking. Something is coming to Earth, an ancient force from the Dark Times. Something powerful, angry, and all-consuming...

Continuity
 The novel features the return of the Mandragora Helix and is a sequel to the 1976 Fourth Doctor serial The Masque of Mandragora. The Doctor not having had a decent Italian meal "since 1492" is, in itself, a reference to the serial. Reference is also made to the Past Doctor Adventure The Eleventh Tiger, the Doctor Who Magazine comic strip The Mark of Mandragora, and the Big Finish audio drama Sarah Jane Smith: Buried Secrets in which fragments of the Helix previously returned.
 Several references are made to Park Vale, the school which features in The Sarah Jane Adventures. The Tycho Project telescope from The Sarah Jane Adventures serial The Last Sontaran is also mentioned.
The Doctor says that astrology dates from the "Dark Times", and is shared by every species in the universe. This was also the basis for the Sarah Jane Adventures serial Secrets of the Stars.

Critical reaction

The novel was previewed and later reviewed in Doctor Who Magazine and was well received by critics, leading to one review to call for Russell to be allowed to script an episode of the TV series.  The novel was chosen to represent the Tenth Doctor in the special Anniversary reprint set from the BBC in 2013.

Outside references
The Doctor says he saw the 1969 Moon landing at the Royal Planetary Society, having been invited by "Bernard and Paula". This is a reference to Bernard Quatermass and his daughter. Quatermass is also referred to by Malcolm in "Planet of the Dead" and a Bernard implied to be Quatermass is mentioned by Rachel Jensen in Remembrance of the Daleks.

Audiobook
An abridged audiobook was released on April 9, 2009, read by Bernard Cribbins who played Wilfred Mott in the TV series.

See also

Whoniverse

References

External links

2008 British novels
2008 science fiction novels
New Series Adventures
Tenth Doctor novels
Novels by Gary Russell